The low-density lipoprotein receptor gene family codes for a class of structurally related cell surface receptors that fulfill diverse biological functions in different organs, tissues, and cell types. The role that is most commonly associated with this evolutionarily ancient family is cholesterol homeostasis (maintenance of appropriate concentration of cholesterol). In humans, excess cholesterol in the blood is captured by low-density lipoprotein (LDL) and removed by the liver via endocytosis of the LDL receptor. Recent evidence indicates that the members of the LDL receptor gene family are active in the cell signalling pathways between specialized cells in many, if not all, multicellular organisms.

There are seven members of the LDLR family in mammals, namely:
 LDLR
 VLDL receptor (VLDLR)
 ApoER2, or LRP8
 Low density lipoprotein receptor-related protein 4
 also known as multiple epidermal growth factor (EGF) repeat-containing protein (MEGF7)
 LDLR-related protein 1
 LDLR-related protein 1b
 Megalin.

Human proteins containing this domain 

Listed below are human proteins containing low-density lipoprotein receptor domains:

Class A 
C6;        C7;        8A;       8B;       C9;        CD320;     CFI;
CORIN;     DGCR2;     HSPG2;     LDLR;      LDLRAD2;   LDLRAD3;   LRP1;      LRP10;
LRP11;     LRP12;     LRP1B;     LRP2;      LRP3;      LRP4;      LRP5;      LRP6;
LRP8;      MAMDC4;    MFRP;      PRSS7;     RXFP1;     RXFP2;     SORL1;     SPINT1;
SSPO;      ST14;      TMPRSS4;   TMPRSS6;   TMPRSS7;   TMPRSS9 (serase-1B);   VLDLR;

Class B 
EGF;       LDLR;      LRP1;      LRP10;     LRP1B;     LRP2;      LRP4;      LRP5;
LRP5L;     LRP6;      LRP8;      NID1;      NID2;      SORL1;     VLDLR;

See also
 Soluble low-density lipoprotein receptor-related protein (sLRP) - impaired function is related to Alzheimer's disease.

Structure 

The members of the LDLR family are characterized by distinct functional domains present in characteristic numbers. These modules are:
 LDL receptor type A (LA) repeats of 40 residues each, displaying a triple-disulfide-bond-stabilized negatively charged surface; certain head-to-tail combinations of these repeats are believed to specify ligand interactions; 
 LDL receptor type B repeats, also known as EGF precursor homology regions, containing EGF-like repeats and YWTD beta propeller domains;  
 a transmembrane domain, and 
 the cytoplasmic region with (a) signal(s) for receptor internalization via coated pits, containing the consensus tetrapeptide Asn-Pro-Xaa-Tyr (NPxY). This cytoplasmic tail controls both endocytosis and signaling by interacting with the phosphotyrosine binding (PTB) domain-containing proteins.

In addition to these domains which can be found in all receptors of the gene family, LDL receptor and certain isoforms of ApoER2 and VLDLR contain a short region which can undergo O-linked glycosylation, known as O-linked sugar domain. ApoER2 moreover, can harbour a cleavage site for the protease furin between type A and type B repeats which enables production of a soluble receptor fragment by furin-mediated processing.

References

External links 

 Schematic representation of the seven mammalian LDL receptor (LDLR) family members
 LDL receptor family members
 

 
Receptors
Protein families
Signal transduction
Neurophysiology